Modlany is a municipality and village in Teplice District in the Ústí nad Labem Region of the Czech Republic. It has about 1,100 inhabitants.

Administrative parts
Villages of Drahkov, Kvítkov, Suché and Věšťany are administrative parts of Modlany.

Geography
The northern part of the municipality with the Modlany village lies in the Most Basin, the southern part with the rest of villages lies in the Central Bohemian Uplands.

History
Modlany was founded in 1328. Originally it belonged to the Kyšperk Castle estate. In 1665, the village was acquired by the Society of Jesus, who founded a school here year later. In 1780, coal mining began and many shafts were created around the village.

Žichlice was a village that was abandoned in 1988 because of expansion of coal mining. The area of the former village is now part of the municipality.

Sights
The most valuable building is the Church of Saint Apollinaris. It was built in 1687–1691.

References

External links

Villages in Teplice District